This is a list of the mammal species recorded in Finland. There are sixty-one mammal species in Finland, of which, one is endangered, three are vulnerable, and five are near threatened.

The following tags are used to highlight each species' conservation status as assessed by the International Union for Conservation of Nature:

Some species were assessed using an earlier set of criteria. Species assessed using this system have the following instead of near threatened and least concern categories:

Order: Rodentia (rodents) 

Rodents make up the largest order of mammals, with over 40% of mammalian species. They have two incisors in the upper and lower jaw which grow continually and must be kept short by gnawing.

Suborder: Sciurognathi
Family: Castoridae (beavers)
Genus: Castor
 American beaver, C. canadensis LC introduced
 European beaver, C. fiber LC
Family: Sciuridae (squirrels)
Subfamily: Sciurinae
Tribe: Sciurini
Genus: Sciurus
 Red squirrel, Sciurus vulgaris NT
Tribe: Pteromyini
Genus: Pteromys
 Siberian flying squirrel, Pteromys volans LR/nt
Family: Gliridae (dormice)
Subfamily: Leithiinae
Genus: Eliomys
 Garden dormouse, Eliomys quercinus VU
Family: Dipodidae (jerboas)
Subfamily: Sicistinae
Genus: Sicista
 Northern birch mouse, Sicista betulina LR/nt
Family: Cricetidae
Subfamily: Arvicolinae
Genus: Arvicola
 Water vole, Arvicola terrestris LR/lc
Genus: Clethrionomys
 Bank vole, Clethrionomys glareolus LR/lc
 Grey red-backed vole, Clethrionomys rufocanus LR/lc
 Northern red-backed vole, Clethrionomys rutilus LR/lc
Genus: Lemmus
 Norway lemming, Lemmus lemmus LR/lc
Genus: Microtus
 Field vole, Microtus agrestis LR/lc
 Common vole, Microtus arvalis LR/lc
 Tundra vole, Microtus oeconomus LC
 Southern vole, Microtus rossiaemeridionalis LR/lc
Genus: Myopus
 Wood lemming, Myopus schisticolor NT
Family: Muridae (mice, rats, voles, gerbils, hamsters, etc.)
Subfamily: Murinae
Genus: Apodemus
 Striped field mouse, Apodemus agrarius LR/lc
 Yellow-necked mouse, Apodemus flavicollis LR/lc
Genus: Micromys
 Harvest mouse, Micromys minutus LR/nt

Order: Lagomorpha (lagomorphs) 

The lagomorphs comprise two families, Leporidae (hares and rabbits), and Ochotonidae (pikas). Though they can resemble rodents, and were classified as a superfamily in that order until the early twentieth century, they have since been considered a separate order. They differ from rodents in a number of physical characteristics, such as having four incisors in the upper jaw rather than two.
Family: Leporidae (rabbits, hares)
Genus: Lepus
European hare, L. europaeus 
Mountain hare, L. timidus

Order: Erinaceomorpha (hedgehogs and gymnures) 

The order Erinaceomorpha contains a single family, Erinaceidae, which comprise the hedgehogs and gymnures. The hedgehogs are easily recognised by their spines while gymnures look more like large rats.

Family: Erinaceidae (hedgehogs)
Subfamily: Erinaceinae
Genus: Erinaceus
 West European hedgehog, Erinaceus europaeus LR/lc

Order: Soricomorpha (shrews, moles, and solenodons) 

The "shrew-forms" are insectivorous mammals. The shrews and solenodons closely resemble mice while the moles are stout-bodied burrowers.

Family: Soricidae (shrews)
Subfamily: Crocidurinae
Genus: Crocidura
 Lesser white-toothed shrew, Crocidura suaveolens LR/lc
Subfamily: Soricinae
Tribe: Nectogalini
Genus: Neomys
 Eurasian water shrew, Neomys fodiens LR/lc
Tribe: Soricini
Genus: Sorex
 Common shrew, Sorex araneus LR/lc
 Laxmann's shrew, Sorex caecutiens LR/lc
 Taiga shrew, Sorex isodon LR/lc
 Eurasian least shrew, Sorex minutissimus LR/lc
 Eurasian pygmy shrew, Sorex minutus LR/lc
Family: Talpidae (moles)
Subfamily: Talpinae
Tribe: Talpini
Genus: Talpa
 European mole, Talpa europaea LR/lc

Order: Chiroptera (bats) 

The bats' most distinguishing feature is that their forelimbs are developed as wings, making them the only mammals capable of flight. Bat species account for about 20% of all mammals.

Family: Vespertilionidae
Subfamily: Myotinae
Genus: Myotis
 Daubenton's bat, Myotis daubentonii LR/lc
 Whiskered bat, Myotis mystacinus LR/lc
 Natterer's bat, Myotis nattereri LR/lc
Subfamily: Vespertilioninae
Genus: Eptesicus
 Northern bat, Eptesicus nilssoni LR/lc
Genus: Plecotus
Brown long-eared bat, P. auritus 
Genus: Vespertilio
 Parti-coloured bat, Vespertilio murinus LR/lc
Family: Molossidae
Genus: Tadarida
 European free-tailed bat, Tadarida teniotis LR/lc

Order: Cetacea (whales) 

The order Cetacea includes whales, dolphins and porpoises. They are the mammals most fully adapted to aquatic life with a spindle-shaped nearly hairless body, protected by a thick layer of blubber, and forelimbs and tail modified to provide propulsion underwater.

Suborder: Mysticeti
Family: Balaenidae (right whales)
Genus: Balaena
 North Atlantic right whale, Eubalaena glacialis CR or functionally extinct in Eastern Atlantic
Family: Balaenopteridae
Subfamily: Balaenopterinae
Genus: Balaenoptera
 Fin whale, Balaenoptera physalus EN
 Common minke whale, Balaenoptera acutorostrata LC
Subfamily: Megapterinae
Genus: Megaptera
 Humpback whale, Megaptera novaeangliae LC
Suborder: Odontoceti
Family: Phocoenidae
Genus: Phocoena
 Harbour porpoise, Phocoena phocoena VU
Family: Monodontidae
Genus: Delphinapterus
 Beluga, Delphinapterus leucas VU
Family: Ziphidae
Genus: Mesoplodon
 Sowerby's beaked whale, Mesoplodon bidens DD
Family: Delphinidae (marine dolphins)
Genus: Lagenorhynchus
 White-beaked dolphin, Lagenorhynchus albirostris LR/lc
Genus: Tursiops
 Bottlenose dolphin, Tursiops truncatus DD
Genus: Grampus
 Risso's dolphin, Grampus griseus DD
Genus: Orcinus
 Orca, Orcinus orca DD

Order: Carnivora (carnivorans) 

There are over 260 species of carnivorans, the majority of which feed primarily on meat. They have a characteristic skull shape and dentition. 
Suborder: Feliformia
Family: Felidae (cats)
Subfamily: Felinae
Genus: Lynx
 Eurasian lynx, Lynx lynx 
Suborder: Caniformia
Family: Canidae (dogs, foxes)
Genus: Canis
 Gray wolf, Canis lupus 
Genus: Nyctereutes
 Raccoon dog, Nyctereutes procyonoides  introduced
Genus: Vulpes
 Arctic fox, Vulpes lagopus 
 Red fox, Vulpes vulpes 
Family: Ursidae (bears)
Genus: Ursus
 Brown bear, Ursus arctos 
Family: Mustelidae (mustelids)
Genus: Gulo
 Wolverine, Gulo gulo 
Genus: Lutra
 European otter, Lutra lutra 
Genus: Martes
 Pine marten, Martes martes 
Genus: Meles
 European badger, Meles meles 
Genus: Mustela
 Stoat, Mustela erminea 
 European mink, Mustela lutreola  extirpated
 Least weasel, Mustela nivalis 
 European polecat, Mustela putorius 
Genus: Neogale
American mink, N. vison  introduced
Family: Odobenidae
Genus: Odobenus
 Walrus, Odobenus rosmarus 
Family: Phocidae (earless seals)
Genus: Halichoerus
 Grey seal, Halichoerus grypus 
Genus: Pagophilus
 Harp seal, Pagophilus groenlandicus 
Genus: Pusa
 Ringed seal, Pusa hispida

Order: Artiodactyla (even-toed ungulates) 

The even-toed ungulates are ungulates whose weight is borne about equally by the third and fourth toes, rather than mostly or entirely by the third as in perissodactyls. There are about 220 artiodactyl species, including many that are of great economic importance to humans.

Family: Bovidae (bovids)
Subfamily: Bovidae
Genus: Bison
 European bison, B. bonasus  extirpated
Family: Suidae (pigs)
Subfamily: Suinae
Genus: Sus
 Wild boar, S. scrofa 
Family: Cervidae (deer)
Subfamily: Capreolinae
Genus: Alces
 Moose, A. alces 
Genus: Capreolus
 Roe deer, C. capreolus 
Genus: Odocoileus
 White-tailed deer, O. virginianus  introduced
Genus: Rangifer
 Reindeer, R. tarandus 
Subfamily: Cervinae
Genus: Dama
 Fallow deer, D. dama  introduced

See also
Fauna of Finland
List of chordate orders
Lists of mammals by region
List of prehistoric mammals
Mammal classification
List of mammals described in the 2000s

Notes

References
 

M
Mammals
Finland
Finland